Jhingan or Jhingon is a surname. Notable people with the surname include:

Sandesh Jhingan (born 1993), Indian footballer
Priya Jhingan, Indian Army officer

See also
 Jhingran

Surnames of Indian origin